SPT0615-JD is a dwarf galaxy situated within the constellation Pictor, and is the farthest galaxy ever imaged by means of gravitational lensing, as of 2018. Brett Salmon of the Space Telescope Science Institute in Baltimore was the lead scientist of the study of the galaxy.

The galaxy was identified in the Hubble Space Telescope Reionization Lensing Cluster Survey (RELICS) and companion S-RELICS Spitzer program and is at the limits of Hubble's detection capabilities. As a consequence of the effect of a gravitational field of a galaxy cluster of an extremely large size, SPT-CL J0615-5746, (abbreviated to SPT0615), situated at a distance closer to Earth, light from SPT0615-JD  located at a further distance, is amplified and distorted (lensed - Einstein 1936; Khvolson 1924; Link 1936) on its motion to the Hubble telescope. This distortion causes the light from the galaxy to arrive as an image lengthened to an arc of about 2 arcseconds long.

"JD" is short for "J-band Dropout"  (the galaxy is not detected in the so-called J-band (F125W) The observed image is of 13.3 billion years ago, indicating the galaxy existed when the universe was about only 500 million years in existence. The galaxy is less than 2,500 light-years across.

References

Additional reading 

Dwarf galaxies
Pictor (constellation)